Rudow is a Berlin U-Bahn station located on the  line. There is a bus link to Berlin Schönefeld Airport, served by the line 171 and the express bus X7. Since 2015, the station has been under extended refurbishment to provide a better interchange between buses serving Brandenburg Airport/BER and the trains.

Opened in 1972 by architect Rümmler it is the end station of the U7 line. Storage sidings for subway trains at the southern end measure about 350m. The next is Zwickauer Damm (returning for Rathaus Spandau).

References

External links

U7 (Berlin U-Bahn) stations
Buildings and structures in Neukölln
Railway stations in Germany opened in 1972